Enrique Torres (born 31 July 1928) was a Mexican former sports shooter. He competed at the 1964 Summer Olympics and the 1968 Summer Olympics.

References

External links
 

1928 births
Possibly living people
Mexican male sport shooters
Olympic shooters of Mexico
Shooters at the 1964 Summer Olympics
Shooters at the 1968 Summer Olympics
Sportspeople from Mexico City
Pan American Games medalists in shooting
Pan American Games bronze medalists for Mexico
Shooters at the 1963 Pan American Games
20th-century Mexican people